Robert Armitage may refer to:
Robert Armitage (politician) (1866–1944), British Member of Parliament for Leeds Central
Robert Perceval Armitage (1906–1990), British colonial administrator in Africa
Robert Armitage (Royal Navy officer) (1905–1982), British bomb disposal expert and George Cross recipient
Robert Armitage (cricketer) (1955–2000), South African cricketer